Thomas Owen Potter (10 September 1844 – 27 April 1909) was an English cricketer active in 1866 who played for Lancashire. He was born in Calcutta and died in Hoylake. He appeared in one first-class match and scored 39 runs with a highest score of 39.

Notes

1844 births
1909 deaths
English cricketers
Lancashire cricketers